Ashley Hugill (born 28 September 1994 in York, Yorkshire) is an English professional snooker player.

Career
In May 2017, Hugill came through Q-School by winning six matches to earn a two-year card on the World Snooker Tour for the 2017–18 and 2018–19 seasons. Hugill made a maximum break during event 3 of the 2019–20 Challenge Tour.

Performance and rankings timeline

Career finals

Amateur finals: 4 (3 titles)

References

External links

Ashley Hugill at worldsnooker.com

English snooker players
Living people
1994 births
Sportspeople from York